Juan Carlos Caicedo Solís (born 4 January 1998) is a Colombian footballer who plays as a defensive midfielder for Categoría Primera A side Cortuluá, on loan from Deportivo Cali.

Club career

Deportivo Cali
Caicedo started his career at Semillero FC in El Cerrito, where he played until he was 17, before moving to Deportivo Cali.

Caicedo was the first player ever from Deportivo Cali's Escuelas Filiales (Subsidiary Schools) to be called up for the clubs professional team in March 2020 at the age of 20. A few days later, on 28 March 2018, Caicedo made his professional debut for the club against Deportes Tolima, when he came on as a substitute for Christian Rivera in the half time. He played one more game in 2018 in the following month and sat on the bench for three more games the rest of the year.

In 2019, he got a few more games, making a total of nine league appearances. On 21 January 2020, 22-year old Caicedo moved to fellow league club Cúcuta Deportivo on loan for the 2020 season. He got his debut five days later, on 26 January 2020, against Patriotas Boyacá.

Caicedo returned to Cali for the 2021 season. On 23 February 2021, Caicedo was loaned out again, this time to Categoría Primera B club Cortuluá for the rest of the year.

Personal life
Caicedo is the cousin of Colombian international player Jefferson Lerma.

In July 2019, Caicedo became a victim of a theft, when two men tried to close his way in the Capri neighborhood, El Cerrito, Valle del Cauca. Caicedo reacted by speeding up the car he was driving in, ending up crashing into a tree. However, he escaped unharmed and was not seriously injured.

References

External links
 

Living people
1998 births
Association football midfielders
Colombian footballers
Categoría Primera A players
Deportivo Cali footballers
Cúcuta Deportivo footballers
Cortuluá footballers
Sportspeople from Valle del Cauca Department